Andrew Tait was a Scottish football player during the late 1940s / early 1950s.  He signed 'senior' with Dumbarton in December 1949 and was a regular in the team for four seasons.  He signed for Dundee United in September 1953.

References 

Scottish footballers
Dumbarton F.C. players
Dundee United F.C. players
Clyde F.C. players
Albion Rovers F.C. players
Scottish Football League players
Association football wing halves
Year of birth missing